Ghana Music Awards USA is an annual people's choice Awards organized by Don's Music Production who is a well-known registered event hub based in the United States. This respected events powerhouse has successfully organized and produced well patronized Gospel shows, Awards Programs, USA tours for some renowned Ghanaian artistes, and many others.

The Scheme is designed to promote Ghana Music and culture worldwide, create a solid international platform for promotions, sales, collaborations, business opportunities and several other benefits for Ghanaian Musicians, creative artistes and industry practitioners in the United States of America and beyond. It also seeks to encourage and celebrate today's most influential and iconic artistes in the Music industry who have entertained Ghanaians and other nationals living in the United States and Ghana in the course of the Year under review.

Ghana Music Awards - USA, honors artistes in multiple musical genres including Highlife, Hiplife /Hip-Hop, Gospel, Contemporary Inspirational, Afro Pop, Reggae, Dancehall and many others. Categories like Social Media Trending Artist, New Artist of the Year, Collaboration of the Year, Video of the Year, Most Popular Song, Artiste of the Year and several others will also be recognized and given out to well-deserved artistes. A total of 35 individual Awards are presented to deserving artists during the main event which is always scheduled in the third Saturday of August

GMA-USA's events are proudly supported and endorsed by the Ghana Embassy and The Ghana Permanent Mission to the UN, New York, Musicians Union of Ghana (MUSIGA) and the Ministry of Arts and Culture who are all well represented at the GMA-USA eventS.

By organizing this significant musical event, GMA-USA seek to honour the enthusiasm and ingenuity of all its nominees, applauding their creativity in Ghana, the US and beyond.

. The award ceremony is organised in partnership with Embassy of Ghana in Washington, D.C.

History
The awards was Instituted in December 2019 and was launched in New Jersey on January 18, 2020. The first nominees announcement was held in July, 2020 followed by presentation of certificate for nomination to artiste.

The maiden edition of Ghana Music Awards-USA was held at the plush Showboat Theater in Atlantic on October 10, 2020, which was followed by presentations of awards in Ghana in December 2020.

The second edition of GMA-USA was held in The Celebrity Theater at the Raddison Hotel Atlantic City - New Jersey. Prior to that, there  was a nominees party held on April 17, 2021.

Categories
Gospel Song of the Year
New Artist of the Year
Male Vocalist of the Year
Female Vocalist of the Year
Gospel Artist of the Year
Rapper of the Year
Highlife Artist of the Year
Highlife Song of the Year
Afropop Artist of the Year
Reggae/Dancehall Song of the Year
Hiplife/Hip Hop Song of the Year
Group of the Year
Emerging Artist of the Year
Producer/Sound Engineer of the Year
Artist of the Year
Most Popular Song of the Year
US-Based Discovery Act of the Year
US-Based Female Artist of the Year
US-Based Producer/Sound Engineer of the Year
US-Based Best Gospel Song of the Year
US-Based Gospel Artist of the Year
US-Based Best Male Vocalist of the Year
US-Based Afropop Song of the Year
US-Based Music Video of the Year
US-Based Afropop Artist of the Year
US-Based Best Rapper of the Year
US-Based Female Vocalist of the Year
Most Popular US-Based Artist of the Year
Best International Collaboration of the Year (USA)

See also 

 List Of Ghanaian Awards

References 

International music awards
Ghanaian music awards
Award ceremonies
Awards established in 2019